Beyond Broadway is a 2005 (see 2005 in music) album by Ilse Huizinga.

Track listing
 "I Loves You Porgy" (George Gershwin, Ira Gershwin, DuBose Heyward)  – 3:59
 "Wouldn't It Be Loverly" (Alan Jay Lerner, Frederick Loewe)  – 3:31
 "Someone To Watch Over Me" (G. Gershwin, I. Gershwin)  – 3:21
 "I Got Plenty of Nuttin'" (G. Gershwin, I. Gershwin)  – 4:33
 "Goodbye" (Gordon Jenkins)  – 2:51
 "Mad About the Boy" (Noël Coward)  – 4:19
 "On The Street Where You Live" (Lerner, Loewe)  – 3:32
 "I Could Have Danced All Night" (Lerner, Loewe)  – 3:50
 "I'll Close My Eyes" (Buddy Kaye, Billy Reid)  – 3:01
 "You and the Night and the Music" (Arthur Schwartz, Howard Dietz)  – 3:58
 "Ev'ry Time We Say Goodbye" (Cole Porter)  – 3:27
 "Manhattan" (Richard Rodgers, Lorenz Hart)  – 3:59

Credits 

 Ilse Huizinga - vocals
 Erik van der Luijt - grand piano, arranger
 Branko Teuwen - double bass
 Victor de Boo - drums
 Enno Spaanderman - saxophone

Ilse Huizinga albums
2005 albums